Ngaruawahia United AFC is an association football club based in Ngāruawāhia, New Zealand. They compete in the NRFL Championship, following back-to-back promotions from the WaiBOP Premiership in 2021 and NRFL Division 2 in 2022. Ngaruawahia United AFC play their home matches at Centennial Park, Ngāruawāhia.

Club history
The club was formed in 1968 as Ngaruawahia United, made up primarily of the teenagers attending Ngaruawahia High School. Following the amalgamation of Ngaruawahia United and Affco Rangers in 1977 the club became known as Ngaruawahia-Affco United. In 1986 Affco was dropped from the name.

Ngaruawahia United honours board
1976 Cambridge Tournament runners-up
1998 Chatham Cup semi-finalists
2006 Northern League Division Two runners-up
2006 Cambridge Tournament runners-up
2007 Cambridge Tournament Plate winners
2008 Cambridge Tournament winners
2009 Promotion to Premier League
2011 Promoted to Division 1
2013 Promoted to Premier Division
2020 WaiBOP Premiership runners-up
2021 Cambridge Tournament winners
2021 Chatham Cup round of sixteen
2021 WaiBOP Premiership winners

1998 Chatham Cup run 
In 1998 Ngaruawahia United went on a Chatham Cup run that took the club all the way to the semi-finals. Ngaruawahia United occupied the sports headlines in New Zealand until they met Dunedin Technical. Playing away from home, Ngaruawahia United had several chances to cause an upset, but it was the South Islanders who would prevail 2–0.

International friendlies 
Ngaruawahia United played its first friendly international since the 1990s against the National League champions of the Solomon Islands. Marist FC – who were eliminated from the 2006 OFC Club Championship at the hands of Auckland City and AS Pirae – travelled to Ngaruawahia to play the friendly emphasising the Kiwi clubs strong South Pacific connections.

After a goalless first half, Marist FC scored two late second-half goals to take the game 2–0 despite a gritty performance from Ngaruawahia United. At the end of the match Ngaruawahia United President Maxine Williams presented Marist FC coach Patrick Miniti with a hamper of football gear to take back to the Melanesian country.

Shortly after this match, Ngaruawahia United signed Solomon Islands international player Stanley Waita. Waita won 30 caps for his country and appeared in the OFC Nations Cup Final and FIFA World Cup playoff against Australia. Waita was a significant factor in Ngaruawahia United's promotion charge scoring a raft of goals. His form was enough to earn him a contract with NZFC side Waikato FC.

In 2007 Ngaruawahia United played Solomon Islands U-20 at Centennial Park losing the match 5–1. Lance Louvie scored for Ngaruawahia United but Solomon Islands U-20 proved too strong with a strong performance. Solomon Islands U-20 later drew 1–1 with New Zealand U-20 at Trusts Stadium in the OFC U-20 Men's Championship won by the host nation.

Ngaruawahia United's second international fixture saw a match with Samoa U-20 at the Charles J. Dempsey Football Academy at the Oceania Football Confederation (OFC) headquarters in Penrose, Auckland, the match finishing in an entertaining 3–3 draw. Star performers for Ngaruawahia included debutant and former Solomon Islands international midfielder David Firisua and young South African-born attacker Lance Louvie.

Ngaruawahia United has played international fixtures previously including a 2–1 win over Tonga back in the 1990s at Centennial Park.

International record since 2006

vs. Marist FC (SOLOMON ISLANDS) lost 0–2
vs. Samoa U-20 (SAMOA) drew 3–3
vs. Solomon Islands U-20 (SOLOMON ISLANDS) lost 1–5

References

External links
Club website The website of Ngaruawahia United Football Club
Club archives, containing material from media records, administrative papers, and tables, along with over 68,000 photos and videos of matches and teams from 1964 in Ngaruawahia Club.

Association football in New Zealand
Association football clubs in New Zealand
Association football clubs established in 1968
Sport in Waikato
1968 establishments in New Zealand
Ngāruawāhia